The Victoria Cross (VC) is a military decoration awarded for valour "in the face of the enemy" to members of armed forces of some Commonwealth countries and previous British Empire territories. It takes precedence over all other orders, decorations and medals, and may be awarded to a person of any rank in any service and to civilians under military command. The award was officially constituted when Queen Victoria issued a warrant under the Royal sign-manual on 29 January 1856 that was gazetted on 5 February 1856. The order was backdated to 1854 to recognise acts of valour during the Crimean War. The first awards ceremony was held on 26 June 1857, where Queen Victoria invested 62 of the 111 Crimean recipients in a ceremony in Hyde Park.

The first citations of the cat, particularly those in the initial gazette of 24 February 1857, varied in the details of each action; some specify date ranges while some specify a single date. The original Royal Warrant did not contain a specific clause regarding posthumous awards, although official policy was to not award the VC posthumously. Between 1897 and 1901, several notices were issued in the London Gazette regarding soldiers who would have been awarded the VC had they survived. In a partial reversal of policy in 1902, six of the soldiers mentioned were granted the VC, but not "officially" awarded the medal. In 1907, the posthumous policy was completely reversed and medals were sent to the next of kin of the six soldiers. The Victoria Cross warrant was not officially amended to explicitly allow posthumous awards until 1920, but one quarter of all awards for the First World War were posthumous. Three people have been awarded the VC and Bar, which is a medal for two actions; Noel Chavasse, Arthur Martin-Leake and Charles Upham. Chavasse received both medals for actions in the First World War, while Martin-Leake was awarded his first VC for actions in the Second Boer War, and his second for actions during the First World War. Charles Upham received both VCs for actions during the Second World War.

The Victoria Cross has been awarded 1,358 times to 1,355 individual recipients. The largest number of recipients for one campaign is the First World War, for which 628 medals were awarded to 627 recipients. The largest number awarded for actions on a single day was 24 on 16 November 1857, at the Second Relief of Lucknow, during the Indian Mutiny. The largest number awarded for a single action was 18, for the assault on Sikandar Bagh, during the Second Relief of Lucknow. The largest number awarded to one unit during a single action was 7, to the 2nd/24th Foot, for the defence of Rorke's Drift (22–23 January 1879), during the Zulu War.
Two SAS fighters hunting Osama Bin Laden may be awarded the Victoria Cross - the first time a living soldier has been considered for the honour for more than 30 years. The rare move to bestow the highest military accolade is under consideration by senior defence officials who will ultimately make the recommendation to the Queen
(Andrew J) - 22nd SAS in 2001 - unknown 

Since 1991, Australia, Canada and New Zealand have created their own separate Victoria Crosses: the Victoria Cross for Australia, the Victoria Cross (Canada), and the Victoria Cross for New Zealand. Only five of these separate medals have been awarded, all for actions in the War in Afghanistan; Willie Apiata received the Victoria Cross for New Zealand on 26 July 2007; on 16 January 2009 Mark Donaldson, on 24 August 2010 Daniel Keighran, on 23 January 2011 Ben Roberts-Smith, and on 13 February 2014 Cameron Baird (posthumous award), were awarded the Victoria Cross for Australia. As these are separate medals, they are not included in this l

Notes
A  Between 1858 and 1881, the Victoria Cross could be awarded for actions taken "under circumstances of extreme danger" not in the face of the enemy. O'Hea single-handedly put out a fire in an ammunition cart, and was awarded the VC for that action. This rule was changed in 1881 to allow only acts "in the presence of the enemy".
B  628 Medals were awarded to 627 recipients. Two Bars were awarded; Noel Godfrey Chavasse was awarded the Victoria Cross and Bar for two separate actions; Arthur Martin-Leake was awarded a VC in the Second Boer War, and his Bar for actions in the First World War.
C  182 medals were awarded to 181 recipients; Charles Upham was awarded the Victoria Cross and Bar.

References
General
 
 
 
 
Specific

Campaign